Libya Al Ahrar is a Libyan TV channel broadcast by satellite from its headquarters in Doha. The channel was created in 2011 during the Libyan Civil War. It presents news, opinions, analysis, photo and video reports about Libya in specific and the region in a wider scope. It focuses on Libya’s revolution and future toward building a democratic state.

Structure
Libya TV was founded by Libyans led by Mahmmud Shammam and Mohamad A. Al Akari. With the full support by the Libyan PM, Dr. Mahmmud Jebrel, who helped to bring the full support from the Qatari government. Mohamad A. Al Akari was the first General Manager, Serage Beshti was the Head of Administration, and Huda Al Srari was Head of PR. Currently it has around 50 employees working to provide exposure to Libyans different opinions. Huda Alsrari were named to be head of Doha operation later 2013 and held this position till mid of 2014 before she had to resign with Mahmoud Shamam.

The headquarters is in Doha, and additional studios are located in Benghazi and Tripoli. Libya TV claims to have correspondents "throughout Libya." Along with Arabic, the channel also broadcasts a show in the Tamazight language and will contain English programming in the future.

Funding
Libya TV is mostly funded by Libyan expatriate businessmen. Qatar provides "facilities and technical staff" through the Alrayyan TV station.

Notable broadcasts
Libya TV's plan for April 2011 was to broadcast four hours of original programs, including a news segment and a talk show, daily. Libya TV now broadcasts 12 hours per day both in Arabic and the Tamazight language.

In the weeks prior to the battle of Tripoli, Libya TV aired recorded phone calls between key figures in the Gaddafi regime in which they discussed moving bodies of the deceased to places where NATO had previously targeted during airstrikes.

On 21 August 2011, amidst the Battle of Tripoli, then- Prime Minister Mahmoud Jibril gave a speech on Libya TV urging revolutionary fighters against looting, revenge killings, abusing foreign nationals and mistreating prisoners of war. He also called for unity and asked that police and army units in Tripoli disavow Gaddafi but remain at their posts.

On 20 October 2011, Libya TV was the first news channel to report the capture and subsequent death of Muammar Gaddafi.

See also 
Libyan Jamahiriya Broadcasting Corporation
Media of Libya
Free speech in the media during the 2011 Libyan civil war
Heba Shibani

References

Further reading

External links 
 
 Twitter
 Facebook
 Youtube Channel
 Livestream (Livestation)

2011 establishments in Qatar
Television channels and stations established in 2011
Mass media in Libya
Mass media in Doha
Television stations in Libya
Arabic-language television stations